"In Lonely Expectation" is an American television play broadcast on April 2, 1959 as part of the CBS television series, Playhouse 90.  The cast is led by Diane Baker. Franklin Schaffner was the director and Mayo Simon the writer.

Plot
A woman converts a house into a home for unwed mothers and tries to help a teenage girl decide whether to keep her child or agree to an adoption.

Cast
The cast includes the following:

 Diane Baker - Sheila
 Susan Harrison - P.J.
 Philip Abbott - Leonard Cass
 Kathleen Maguire - Miss Schoengren
 Beverly Washburn - Betty Anne
 Joanne Linville - June
 Buzz Martin - Billy
 Jenny Maxwell - Bo
 Virginia Kaye - Mrs. Runnells
 Mary Gregory - Mrs. Watkins
 Carolyn Horn - Miss Talbot
 Connie Davis - P.J.'s Mother
 Phyllis Standish - Carol
 Kathleen O'Malley - Nurse
 Sally Kellerman - Receptionist
 Meg Wyllie - Sewing Teacher

Production
The program aired on April 2, 1959, on the CBS television series Playhouse 90. Mayo Simon was the writer and Franklin Schaffner the director.

References

1959 American television episodes
Playhouse 90 (season 3) episodes
1959 television plays